Elaphriella is a genus of sea snails, marine gastropod mollusks, in the family Solariellidae.

Species
Species within the genus Elaphriella include:
 Elaphriella cantharos Vilvens & Williams, 2016
 Elaphriella corona (Y.-C. Lee & W.-L. Wu, 2001)
 Elaphriella dikhonikhe Vilvens & Williams, 2016
 Elaphriella diplax (B. A. Marshall, 1999)
 Elaphriella eukhonikhe Vilvens & Williams, 2016
 Elaphriella helios Vilvens & Williams, 2016
 Elaphriella leia Vilvens & Williams, 2016
 Elaphriella meridiana (Dell, 1953)
 Elaphriella olivaceostrigata (Schepman, 1908)
 Elaphriella opalina (Shikama & Hayashi, 1977)
 Elaphriella paulinae Vilvens & Williams, 2016
 Elaphriella wareni Vilvens & Williams, 2016

References

 Vilvens, C.; Williams, S. T. (2016). New genus and new species of Solariellidae (Gastropoda: Trochoidea) from New Caledonia, Fiji, Vanuatu, Solomon Islands, Philippines, Papua New Guinea and French Polynesia. in: Héros, V. et al. (Ed.) Tropical Deep-Sea Benthos 29. Mémoires du Muséum national d'Histoire naturelle (1993). 208: 267-289.

External links
Williams S.T., Kano Y., Warén A. & Herbert D.G. (2020). Marrying molecules and morphology: first steps towards a reevaluation of solariellid genera (Gastropoda: Trochoidea) in the light of molecular phylogenetic studies. Journal of Molluscan Studies. 86(1): 1–26.

Solariellidae